Plasmodium guyannense is a parasite of the genus Plasmodium subgenus Sauramoeba. As in all Plasmodium species, P. guyannense has both vertebrate and insect hosts. The vertebrate hosts for this parasite are reptiles.

Taxonomy 
The parasite was first described by Telford in 1979. This species had previously been considered to be Plasmodium cnemidophori.

Description 
Young trophozoites contain prominent vacuoles.

Schizonts contain 40 to 74 nuclei and have pigment.

Distribution 
This species is found in Guyana, South America.

Hosts 
The only known host is the lizard Plica plica.

References 

guyannense